Pretty Little Liars is a series of young adult novels by Sara Shepard. Beginning with 2006's initial novel of the same name, the series follows the lives of four girls—Spencer Hastings, Hanna Marin, Aria Montgomery and Emily Fields.

The novels appeared on The New York Times Best Seller list for 62 weeks.  The series spawned a media franchise with a television series adaptation loosely based on the novels which debuted on June 8, 2010, on ABC Family. The franchise has been licensed by Amazon.com's Kindle Worlds range of non-canon ebooks.

Overview

The series is loosely divided into arcs, chronicling the introduction and reveal of each "A". Set in the suburbs of Philadelphia, the series follows the lives of four teenage girls nicknamed the Pretty Little Liars or simply the Liars, whose clique falls apart after the disappearance of their queen bee leader, Alison DiLaurentis. Three years after her mysterious disappearance, the girls begin receiving intimidating messages from an anonymous character named "A". "A" threatens to expose their secrets, including long-forgotten ones they thought only Alison knew. Shortly after the messages begin, Alison's body is discovered buried in her yard. The books progress with the four girls trying to figure out the identity of "A" and facing many dangerous obstacles and twists as they do so.

Characters

The series has many characters, most of them recurring. The main characters are:

Spencer Hastings: Spencer is a headstrong, intelligent, overachieving girl who comes from the wealthy Hastings family and is usually forced into winning everything.

 Hanna Marin: Hanna is the bubbly, strong, and fierce "it-girl" of the group following Alison's disappearance. She suffers from an eating disorder, about which she received taunts from Alison.

Aria Montgomery: Aria is a quirky and artsy girl who, at the beginning of the books, is trying to find herself.

Emily Fields: Emily is considered the jock of the group, being a physical, loyal girl who struggles with her sexuality. Near the end of the series she also struggles with depression and suicidal thoughts.

Alison DiLaurentis: Alison is the former "Queen Bee" of her clique, consisting of Spencer, Hanna, Aria and Emily. It is later revealed that the Alison the girls thought they knew was her twin sister, Courtney. "Real Ali" was friends with Naomi Zeigler and Riley Wolfe up until the sixth grade, when Courtney took her place. She had supposedly been killed at the beginning of the series. However, she is revealed to have been alive and also their tormentor "A" as she was mistaken for her twin sister Courtney, who pretended to be her. Alison was sent to The Preserve at Addison-Stevens, a rehab facility for mentally ill patients, which she believed was the Liars' fault, and has been plotting revenge ever since.

Her identical twin sister, Courtney DiLaurentis, debuted in Wanted after the TV show began in 2010. In the prequel, Courtney-as-Ali started disappearing in the last chapter and getting almost killed numerous times, until the end of the series (Vicious) when Ali-as-Courtney came out and started becoming friends with her twin "Ali" again after rehab with Tabitha and Iris, two lookalikes of Ali, all in the penultimate chapter.

In the book, their older brother's name is Jason DiLaurentis and their half-sisters are Melissa and Spencer Hastings.

Courtney DiLaurentis: "Alison", the one who originally befriended the four girls in the sixth grade, is later revealed to be actually Courtney in the books (often referred to by the Liars as Our Ali, or Their Ali.) She is the third child to Jessica and Kenneth. The twins were described to be inseparable as children, but Alison started to exhibit a vicious jealousy towards Courtney as they grew up, and the close bond deteriorated completely when she once tried to drown Courtney. Probably in a psychological phenomenon known as projection, Alison managed to convince, and possibly brainwash, Courtney at home and at school that she indeed was the jealous one. She made her refer to herself as Alison, adamantly, to their parents and teachers, her motive being that her sister would eventually be detained for insanity. Her plan eventually worked, and was sent to The Preserve at Addison-Stevens after a physical argument with Alison. But years later in a fit of vengeance on a rare visit home, Courtney managed to swindle a plan to trick their parents that Alison was Courtney when it was time to leave, Ali's claims that she was Ali making her parents believe her even less. Subsequently, Courtney morphs into "Queen Bee Ali" and, out of pure chance, befriends the Liars up until the night of her infamous disappearance when she was killed and buried by the real Alison DiLaurentis and her accomplice Nick Maxwell.

A: A is the main antagonist of the series, being, for the most part, an anonymous character who relentlessly torments many characters, in particular the Liars. Mona Vanderwaal, Alison DiLaurentis and Nick Maxwell are discovered to be A. Mona became A due to Alison and the Liars being responsible for The Jenna Thing, which burned her too. However, she is killed when Spencer pushes her off a cliff face and her neck is caught between rocks. However, a new "A" rises, this time even more determined to hurt the Liars. This A is revealed to be Alison herself who wanted revenge on the Liars for ruining her life and Nick, who is revealed to be her accomplice.

Novels

First Arc

Second Arc

Third Arc

Fourth Arc

Companion novels

References

External links

Book series introduced in 2006
American young adult novels
Novel series

HarperCollins books
Fictional identical twins
American novels adapted into television shows
Alloy Entertainment